Baba Salman (also Romanized as Bābā Salmān and Bā Bā Salmān; also known as ‘Eşmatābād) is a village in Maviz Rural District of the Central District of Shahriar County, Tehran province, Iran. At the 2006 National Census, its population was 5,057 in 1,204 households. The following census in 2011 counted 5,194 people in 1,323 households. The latest census in 2016 showed a population of 4,859 people in 1,310 households; it was the largest village in its rural district.

References 

Shahriar County

Populated places in Tehran Province

Populated places in Shahriar County